Tom Nørring is a Danish diplomat who, as of 2019, serves as the ambassador of Denmark to Australia, in which capacity he is simultaneously accredited to New Zealand and Fiji.

References

External links
 Video of Nørring presenting his credentials to President Jioji Konusi Konrote of Fiji

Living people
Ambassadors of Denmark to Australia
Year of birth missing (living people)
Danish diplomats
Ambassadors of Denmark to New Zealand
Ambassadors of Denmark to Fiji